Ali Kola (also Romanized as ‘Alī Kolā) is a village in Chapakrud Rural District, Gil Khuran District, Juybar County, Mazandaran Province, Iran. At the 2006 census, its population was 94, in 26 families.

References 

Populated places in Juybar County